Lee Kai-ming, GBS, SBS, JP (11 October 1937 – 27 October 2022) was the member of the Legislative Council in 1991–95 and 1998–2000 for Labour, Provisional Legislative Council (1996–98). He was also the chairman of the Federation of Hong Kong and Kowloon Labour Unions from 1995 to 1999. He worked closely with Beijing before the handover of Hong Kong and joined the Hong Kong Basic Law Consultative Committee and Preparatory Committee for the Hong Kong Special Administrative Region which oversaw the last phrase of the transition of the sovereignty.

References

1937 births
2022 deaths
Members of the Provisional Legislative Council
Hong Kong trade unionists
Recipients of the Gold Bauhinia Star
Recipients of the Silver Bauhinia Star
HK LegCo Members 1995–1997
HK LegCo Members 1998–2000
Progressive Hong Kong Society politicians
Members of the Preparatory Committee for the Hong Kong Special Administrative Region
Hong Kong Basic Law Consultative Committee members
Members of the Selection Committee of Hong Kong